Stephen of La Ferté was Latin Patriarch of Jerusalem from 1128 until his death in 1130. He was a French priest, abbot of Saint-Jean-en-Vallée at Chartres, and related to Baldwin II, King of Jerusalem.

His predecessor, Warmund, had been a close ally of Baldwin, but Stephen was much less ready to cooperate, reviving claims made by Patriarch Dagobert for church power. He sought to revive an agreement in 1100 between Dagobert and Godfrey of Bouillon, the first ruler of Jerusalem, for possession of Jaffa as an autonomous possession, and even of Jerusalem itself. Baldwin would not agree, and relations between the court and the patriarchate grew worse and worse.

When Stephen died in 1130, his friends suspected poison. Baldwin visited the dying patriarch and asked how he was doing, and Stephen replied 'Sire, I am faring as you desire."

He was succeeded by William of Malines.

References 

Latin Patriarchs of Jerusalem
12th-century Roman Catholic archbishops in the Kingdom of Jerusalem
1130 deaths
Year of birth unknown
12th-century people of the Kingdom of Jerusalem
12th-century French people